Smoke on the Water is a compilation album by the British hard rock band Deep Purple, released in 1998.

Track listing
"Knocking at Your Back Door" – 7:03
"Nobody's Home" – 4:00
"Hush" – 3:32
"Smoke on the Water" (live) – 7:25
"Woman from Tokyo" (live) – 4:02
"Wasted Sunsets" – 4:01
"Gypsy's Kiss" – 5:16
"Strangeways" – 5:57
"Mitzi Dupree" – 5:06
"Dead or Alive" – 4:43

References

1998 compilation albums
Deep Purple compilation albums